The 2022 Vancouver municipal election was held on October 15, 2022, the same day as the municipal elections held throughout British Columbia. Voters elected the mayor of Vancouver (through First past the post. Ten city councillors, 7 park board commissioners, and 9 school board trustees were elected through plurality at-large voting. In addition, voters were presented with 3 capital plan questions. 

A total of 171,494 ballots were cast.

ABC Vancouver won seven of the 11 seats on council, electing its entire aldermanic slate.

Background
Kennedy Stewart was elected to replace outgoing mayor Gregor Robertson in the 2018 mayoral election. Stewart won by just under 1,000 votes against runner-up Ken Sim and was sworn in on November 5, 2018. The city council election, held on the same day, had no party win an outright majority.

The election is scheduled on October 15, 2022, at the same time as all other municipal elections in British Columbia. Canadian citizens over the age of 18 are eligible to vote. Voters vote for the mayor, city council, park board commissioners, school board trustees, and 3 capital plan questions.

In the 2018-2022 term, the Non-Partisan Association (NPA) experienced an internal conflict with 4 of its 5 city councillors leaving the caucus, first sitting as independents before joining new parties. The councillors cited the lack of open nomination process and lack of transparency in the selection of the party's initial mayoral candidate, John Coupar. In addition to the councillors, 3 of the NPA's school board trustees left the party over the same conflict.

Candidates and campaign

Mayoral campaign
Incumbent mayor Kennedy Stewart ran for re-election. Stewart, elected as an independent in 2018, stated his intention to run under his own political party during the 2022 election, and recruited candidates to stand for the 2022 city council election. Stewart said he was additionally open to cross-endorsing candidates from other parties. Stewart later formed a party called Forward Together.

2018 NPA mayoral candidate Ken Sim ran again with the new ABC Vancouver party. Sim's first policy proposal was to abolish the elected park board, but he later renounced that position when his party nominated candidates to be elected to the park board.

The NPA initially nominated park board commissioner John Coupar as their mayoral candidate. Citing a lack of transparency in his nomination process, three of the four NPA remaining city councillors left the party to sit as independents. Of the three, Colleen Hardwick and Sarah Kirby-Yung were speculated to have considered running for mayor before being sidelined in favour of Coupar. John Coupar resigned as NPA candidate on August 5, 2022 after a meeting with the party's board about the "progress of the campaign." Coupar was replaced by Fred Harding, who came sixth in the 2018 mayoral election as the Vancouver 1st candidate.

Colleen Hardwick, one of the ex-NPA councillors, ran for mayor with TEAM for a Livable Vancouver. The party's name is a reference to Hardwick's father's party, The Electors' Action Movement.

Liberal Party strategist Mark Marissen announced his mayoral campaign in 2021. Marissen was later nominated by Progress Vancouver, the successor to Yes Vancouver.

Jody Wilson-Raybould, former MP for Vancouver Granville, declined to run. Shauna Sylvester, 2018 third place mayoral candidate, declined to run again. Green Party councillor Adriane Carr considered running for mayor before declining to run in April 2022.

Results

City Council
All 10 members of Vancouver city council stated their intention on running again during the 2022 municipal election, in addition to mayor Kennedy Stewart. City councillor for the Coalition of Progressive Electors, Jean Swanson, was the last of the 11 members of city council to announce her intention to run again.

OneCity announced the results of their nomination race on March 7, 2022, becoming the first party to nominate a slate of candidates. Incumbent OneCity councillor Christine Boyle was re-nominated, with three new nominees: president of the Urban Native Youth Association Matthew Norris, urban planner Iona Bonamis, and health economist Ian Cromwell.

Adriane Carr of the Vancouver Greens considered running for mayor, but ultimately decided to seek re-election to council in order to avoid splitting the centre-left vote with Mayor Kennedy Stewart. The Greens held a special meeting to select council candidates, renominating Carr and the party's two other incumbent councillors, Pete Fry and Michael Wiebe, along with labour activist Stephanie Smith and climate scientist and economist Devyani Singh.

On April 8, COPE held nominations for all offices, with incumbent councillor Jean Swanson re-nominated to lead a council slate consisting of 2021 Vancouver Centre NDP candidate Breen Ouellette, human rights lawyer Nancy Trigueros, and Indigenous activist Tanya Webking.

On April 11, incumbent councillors Sarah Kirby-Yung, Lisa Dominato, and Rebecca Bligh announced they had joined Ken Sim's new ABC Vancouver party and would run for re-election under that banner.

On May 2, Vision Vancouver announced a slate of four city council candidates. The candidates include Stuart Mackinnon (previously elected as a Green Party park board commissioner), Honieh Barzegari, Lesli Boldt, and Kishone Roy. Roy withdrew for personal reasons on August 16.

On May 25, the NPA announced six city council candidates and four park board candidates. Incumbent councillor Melissa De Genova was re-selected, alongside Elaine Allan, Cinnamon Bhayani, Ken Charko, Mauro Francis, and Arezo Zarrabian. Incumbent parks commissioner Tricia Barker was re-selected, with new candidates Ray Goldenchild, and Dave Pasin. On August 9, Mauro Francis left the party for Progress Vancouver, stating the "internal dynamics of the NPA" after John Coupar's resignation were "getting in the way of the campaign."

On June 11, Colleen Hardwick's TEAM for a Livable Vancouver announced six city council candidates: Cleta Brown, Sean Nardi, Param Nijjar, Grace Quan, Stephen Roberts, and Bill Tieleman.

On June 26, Forward Together, Kennedy Stewart's new municipal party, announced its first three city council candidates: Russil Wvong, Dulcy Anderson, and Hilary Brown.

Election was conducted using Plurality block voting with each voter able to cast ten votes. More than 1.3M votes were cast in this election by the 170,000 voters who voted.

58 candidates ran for aldermanic seats.

Results 
(Percentage of votes shown is percentage of voters who voted, not votes cast.)

Park Board
Park Board commissioner John Irwin announced on March 17, 2022 that he was leaving COPE to join Vision Vancouver, sitting out the remainder of his term as a Vision Vancouver member.

Green Party Park Board commissioner Stuart Mackinnon announced his intention to run for City Council under the Vision Vancouver party on April 25, 2022.

Results

School Board

Results 

Notes

Referendums
Voters were presented with three ballot questions on capital plan borrowing. All borrowing was assented to.

Transportation and core operating technology

The first question was on borrowing $173,450,000 for bridge and street infrastructure, traffic signals and street lighting, electrical services in public places, and core operating technology.

Community facilities

The second question was on borrowing $162,075,000 to be spent on renewal of the Vancouver Aquatic Centre and renewal and upgrades of various other community facilities, including childcare.

Parks, public safety and other civic facilities, climate adaptation and other priorities emerging priorities

The third question was on borrowing $159,475,000 for renewal and upgarding of parks, renewal or rehabilitation of public safety and other civic facilities, including  a fire hall, animal shelter and/or other civic facility projects. Climate adaptation projects such as seawall reconstruction, urban canopy, and other projects, and additional funding for "transportation, community facilities, parks, civic facilities and technology, and/or other emerging priorities".

Political parties

Opinion polls

Notes

Endorsements

References

2022 elections in Canada
Municipal elections in Vancouver
2022 in British Columbia
October 2022 events in Canada